The 2017 season was the inaugural BIG3 season. The regular season began on June 25, 2017 and ended on August 13, 2017.  On August 26, 2017, Trilogy defeated the 3 Headed Monsters 51–46 in the BIG3 Championship game, completing a perfect (10–0) season.

Venues

Draft
The inaugural BIG3 draft was held on April 30, 2017 in Las Vegas, Nevada. Twenty-four players were selected across three rounds.

Player selections

NOTES

Regular season

Week 1 (Brooklyn, NY)
The inaugural week of games in the Big3 Basketball League took place at the Barclays Center, in Brooklyn, New York. It featured four 3x3 basketball games. The winner of each game was determined by the first team to reach 60-points, such that when they 60 or more points they lead by 2 points or more, half time occurs when one team reached 30 or more points. If a team reaches 60 or more points without leading by 2, the game enters "overtime" and continues until one team leads the other by 2 or more points. During this week, the inaugural game went to overtime.

Week 2 (Charlotte, NC)
The second week of games in the Big3 Basketball League took place at the Spectrum Center, in Charlotte, North Carolina. The winner of each game was determined by the first team to reach 50-points, such that when they score 50 or more points and they lead by 2 points. Half time occurs when one team reached 25 or more points. The 50-point goal has been kept in place after the 60-point goal made the games a little too lengthy.

Week 3 (Tulsa, OK)
The third week of games in the Big3 Basketball League took place at the BOK Center, in Tulsa, Oklahoma.

Week 4 (Philadelphia, PA)
The fourth week of games in the Big3 Basketball League took place at the Wells Fargo Center, in Philadelphia, Pennsylvania.

Week 5 (Chicago, IL)
The fifth week of games in the Big3 Basketball League took place at the UIC Pavilion, in Chicago, Illinois. Trilogy clinched a playoff berth with a win over Tri-State.

Week 6 (Dallas, TX)
The sixth week of games in the Big3 Basketball League took place at the American Airlines Center, in Dallas, Texas. 3 Headed Monsters clinched a playoff berth with a win over Tri-State.

Week 7 (Lexington, KY)
The seventh week of games in the Big3 Basketball League took place at Rupp Arena, in Lexington, Kentucky.

Week 8 (Los Angeles, CA)
In a repeat of the first weeks games, the eighth and final week of games in the Big3 Basketball League took place at the Staples Center, in Los Angeles, California. The Ghost Ballers and Power clinch playoff berths as the last two in, eliminating 3's Company due to a loss to the Ball Hogs.

Standings

Notes
 Z clinched top seed
 Y clinched playoff spot

Playoffs

Week 9 (Seattle, WA)
The first post-season games took place in Key Arena, in Seattle, Washington. 3 Headed Monsters, Power, Trilogy and Ghost Ballers competed in two semifinal playoff matchups, to determine who would advance to the championship game.. The Killer 3's, Ball Hogs, 3's Company, and Tri-State played in two games which determined the lower positions, but did not officially count in the standings.

Week 10 (Las Vegas, NV)
The league's inaugural championship game was hosted at MGM Grand Garden Arena in Las Vegas, Nevada. A consolation game was also played between the two teams eliminated in the previous week's semifinals.

Bracket

Individual statistic leaders

Awards
The league's players voted for the inaugural BIG3 awards, which were announced prior to the championship game.

 Most Valuable Player: Rashard Lewis (3 Headed Monsters)
 Coach of the Year: Rick Mahorn (Trilogy)
 Player Captain of the Year: Kenyon Martin (Trilogy)
 Defensive Player of the Year: James White (Trilogy)
 4th Man: Al Thornton (3’s Company)
 Too Hard to Guard: Al Harrington (Trilogy)
 Best Trash Talker: Stephen Jackson (Killer 3s)
 Best Dressed: Cuttino Mobley (Power)

Allen Iverson controversy
Allen Iverson's return was highly publicized when Big3 came to Philadelphia. Before the game, Iverson said, "I'm not going to go out there and be the 25-year-old Allen Iverson—you're going to see a 42-year-old man out there, but to be able to do that, for my fans, I thought that would be cool, just to get back out there again [...] for my fans to get that flashback." However, hours before the game, it was announced Iverson would not be playing. Iverson claimed that he did not play due to "advice from my doctor." Iverson's decision was frowned upon by many in the Philadelphia community.

On Sunday, July 30, the Big3 was scheduled to have games being played in Dallas, Texas. Iverson was slated to appear for his team, 3's Company, but failed to show up to the event or notify league officials about his decision. The next day, TMZ Sports posted pictures showing Iverson at a Chicago Area casino on the morning of the scheduled game.

References

Big3
2017–18 in American basketball
Big